Juodgiris ('black wood', formerly) is a village in Kėdainiai district municipality, in Kaunas County, in central Lithuania. According to the 2011 census, the village had a population of 2 people. There is a petrol station.

There were 3  Juodgiris zaścianki (two in Ariogala volost and one in Vilkija volost) at the beginning of the 20th century.

Demography

References

Villages in Kaunas County
Kėdainiai District Municipality